Katie Schwarzmann (born September 15, 1991) is an American women’s lacrosse player. Having played with the Maryland Terrapins at the collegiate level, she was a two-time winner of the Tewaaraton Trophy. She was also a member of the US national team from 2010 to 2013. In 2016, she was selected first overall in the inaugural United Women's Lacrosse League draft, selected by the Baltimore Ride.

Playing career

NCAA
As a freshman, Schwarzmann would score three goals in the Terrapins victory over Northwestern in the 2010 NCAA championship game. Her 65 goals would lead the team during her sophomore season. 
In the aftermath of her junior season, Schwarzmann’s 72 goals ranked second in the NCAA, while leading all competitors in the ACC conference.  With the Terrapins going undefeated in her senior season, Schwarzmann would open the campaign with a hat trick against Richmond. On February 17, she would score a career high seven goals in a 19-11 win against Syrcause. Following her senior year, she would capture multiple honors including: ACC Offensive Player of the Year, IWLCA First Team All-American, Synapse Sport Midfielder of the Year and ACC Championship Most Valuable Player. 
Schwarzmann graduated third all-time in Terrapins history with 228 goals and 304 points (304). As a side note, she became only the third player to have won the Tewaarton Award twice. The others were Kristen Kjellman (2006–07) and Hannah Nielsen (2008–09).

USA Lacrosse
In 2013, she was a member of the United States roster that captured the gold medal at the 2013 FIL World Cup held east of Toronto in Oshawa, Ontario. The youngest member of the team, she would register 10 goals, complemented by four assists in a total of seven tournament games.

UWLX
The first-ever draft pick of the Baltimore Ride, she was also the first player ever selected in the history of the UWLX Draft.

Coaching career
In July 2014, Schwarzmann was hired in a coaching position with Mount St. Mary's. Her younger sister, Katie, also joined her on the coaching staff.

Statistics
GP = Games Played
G = Goals
A = Assists
PTS = Points
GB = Ground Balls
DC = Draw Controls

Statistics source

Awards and honors

NCAA
2010 ACC Rookie of the Year
2010-13 All-ACC First Team
2011-13 All-ACC Tournament Team
2012-13 ACC Offensive Player of the Year
2012-13 ACC Championship Most Valuable Player
2011 Honda Sports Award finalist
2010 IWLCA All-America third team 
2011-13 IWLCA All-America first team 
2011-13 IWLCA National Midfielder of the Year
2010 NCAA Rookie of the Year
2011 Tewaaraton Award finalist
2012, 2013 Tewaaraton Award

Personal
Her two sisters, Ashley and Lauren played lacrosse at Johns Hopkins.

References

1991 births
American lacrosse players
Women's lacrosse players
Living people
World Games gold medalists
Competitors at the 2017 World Games
Maryland Terrapins women's lacrosse players